Alexandru Ioanovici (born March 30, 1974) is a retired freestyle swimmer from Romania, who represented his native country at the 1996 Summer Olympics in Atlanta, Georgia. He is best known for winning the bronze medal in the men's 4×100 m freestyle relay event at the 1995 FINA Short Course World Championships in Rio de Janeiro, Brazil.

References
 sports-reference

1974 births
Living people
Romanian male freestyle swimmers
Olympic swimmers of Romania
Swimmers at the 1996 Summer Olympics